In computer science, dynamic recompilation is a feature of some emulators and virtual machines, where the system may recompile some part of a program during execution. By compiling during execution, the system can tailor the generated code to reflect the program's run-time environment, and potentially produce more efficient code by exploiting information that is not available to a traditional static compiler.

Uses
Most dynamic recompilers are used to convert machine code between architectures at runtime. This is a task often needed in the emulation of legacy gaming platforms. In other cases, a system may employ dynamic recompilation as part of an adaptive optimization strategy to execute a portable program representation such as Java or .NET Common Language Runtime bytecodes. Full-speed debuggers also utilize dynamic recompilation to reduce the space overhead incurred in most deoptimization techniques, and other features such as dynamic thread migration.

Tasks
The main tasks a dynamic recompiler has to perform are:
 Reading in machine code from the source platform
 Emitting machine code for the target platform

A dynamic recompiler may also perform some auxiliary tasks:
 Managing a cache of recompiled code
 Updating of elapsed cycle counts on platforms with cycle count registers
 Management of interrupt checking
 Providing an interface to virtualized support hardware, for example a GPU
 Optimizing higher-level code structures to run efficiently on the target hardware (see below)

Applications

 Many Java virtual machines feature dynamic recompilation.
 Apple's Rosetta for Mac OS X on x86, allows PowerPC code to be run on the x86 architecture.
 Later versions of the Mac 68K emulator used in classic Mac OS to run 680x0 code on the PowerPC hardware.
 Psyco, a specializing compiler for Python.
 The HP Dynamo project, an example of a transparent binary dynamic optimizer.
 DynamoRIO, an open-source successor to Dynamo that works with the ARM, x86-64 and IA-64 (Itanium) instruction sets.
 The Vx32 virtual machine employs dynamic recompilation to create OS-independent x86 architecture sandboxes for safe application plugins.
 Microsoft Virtual PC for Mac, used to run x86 code on PowerPC.
 FreeKEYB, an international DOS keyboard and console driver with many usability enhancements utilized self-modifying code and dynamic dead code elimination to minimize its in-memory image based on its user configuration (selected features, languages, layouts) and actual runtime environment (OS variant and version, loaded drivers, underlying hardware), automatically resolving dependencies, dynamically relocating and recombining code sections on byte-level granularity and optimizing opstrings based on semantic information provided in the source code, relocation information generated by special tools during assembly and profile information obtained at load time.
 The backwards compatibility functionality of the Xbox 360 (i.e. running games written for the original Xbox) is widely assumed to use dynamic recompilation.
 Apple's Rosetta 2 for Apple silicon, permits many applications compiled for x86-64-based processors to be translated for execution on Apple silicon.

Emulators
 PCSX2, a PlayStation 2 emulator, has a recompiler called "microVU", the successor of "SuperVU".
 GCemu, a GameCube emulator.
 GEM, a Game Boy emulator for MSX uses an optimizing dynamic recompiler.
 DeSmuME, a Nintendo DS emulator, has a dynarec option.
 Soywiz's Psp, a PlayStation Portable emulator, has a dynarec option.
 Mupen64Plus, a multi-platform Nintendo 64 emulator.
 Yabause, a multi-platform Saturn emulator.
PPSSPP, a multi-platform PlayStation Portable emulator, uses a JIT dynamic recompiler by default.

See also
 Binary recompiler
 Binary translation
 Comparison of platform virtualization software
 Just-in-time compilation
 Instrumentation (computer programming)

References

External links
 Dynamic recompiler tutorial
 Blog posts about writing a MIPS to PPC dynamic recompiler

Virtualization
Compiler construction
Emulation software